Julian Russell McCubbin (January 16, 1935 – June 28, 2018) was an American television and film actor and stunt man. He is best known for his work on Sudden Impact (1983) and High Plains Drifter (1973).

Early life
As a teenager, he excelled in sports at Charleston High School. At Hargrave Military Academy, he was captain of the football and track teams, earning him athletic scholarships at numerous colleges and universities. He chose to accept an offer from Virginia Tech. Volunteering for the draft in 1954, he spent the next three years in the United States Army and was honorably discharged in 1957. After leaving the service, he hitchhiked his way across country to California to become an actor.

Filmography

References

External links

1935 births
2018 deaths
American stunt performers
Actors from Charleston, West Virginia
Male actors from West Virginia
Military personnel from West Virginia
Virginia Tech alumni
Hargrave Military Academy alumni